Jean-Pierre Lux (9 January 1946 
– 15 December 2020). was a French rugby union player and sports director. He played as a centre. He was professionally a dental surgeon.

Club career
Lux played for US Tyrosse until 1970/71, moving to US Dax in 1971/72. He was runner-up of the French Championship in 1972/73.

International career
He had 42 caps for France, from 1967 to 1975, scoring 12 tries, 42 points on aggregate. He entered in 9 consecutive editions of the Five Nations Championship, from 1967 to 1975, playing 27 caps and scoring 5 tries, 18 points on aggregate. He won the tournament three times, in 1967, 1968, with a Grand Slam, and 1970, ex-aequo with Wales.

Sports director career
He was President of the European Rugby Cup, from 1999 to 2014. He was a member of the director committee of the National Rugby League, from 1998 to 2012.

References

1946 births
2020 deaths
French rugby union players
France international rugby union players
US Dax players
Rugby union centres